Lars Bleker (born 28 June 1994) is a German professional footballer who plays as a midfielder or right-back for 1. FC Bocholt.

References

External links
 
 

Living people
1994 births
People from Borken (district)
Sportspeople from Münster (region)
German footballers
Footballers from North Rhine-Westphalia
Association football midfielders
Association football fullbacks
3. Liga players
Regionalliga players
Jong FC Twente players
VfL Osnabrück players
SC Wiedenbrück 2000 players
1. FC Bocholt players
German expatriate footballers
German expatriate sportspeople in the Netherlands
Expatriate footballers in the Netherlands